Cator Park is a park in Kidbrooke, Greenwich. It has been won awards for placemaking, biodiversity, and landscape.

It was resigned by HTA Design in collaboration with the London Wildlife Trust and opened to the public in 2019. The park is made up of multiple biophilic spaces including lakes, wetlands and ponds. It is a protected space for wetland birds. The park also includes sports facilities and a 3000m³ play space at the park most elevated point.

In September 2021, the body of Sabina Nessa was found by a dogwalker in the park, under a pile of leaves.

References 

Parks in England
Greater London
Biodiversity